The Basilica of St. Anthony of Padua or simply Church of St. Anthony of Padua, is a Catholic church in the Taufa'ahau road in the town of Nukualofa, the capital of the Kingdom of Tonga in the Pacific Ocean.

Description
This is one of the country's most important Catholic churches, and the other being the main Cathedral of St. Mary in the same city. The Roman or Latin rite church and depends on the diocese of Tonga. The current structure near the royal tombs was built by volunteers starting in 1977 and completed in 1980. Pope John Paul II granted the title of Basilica.

It is a building that stands out for its structure with wooden and cone-shaped, which is not only a religious but a landmark tourist attraction.

See also
Roman Catholicism in Tonga
Basilica of St. Anthony of Padua

References

Roman Catholic churches in Tonga
Buildings and structures in Nukuʻalofa
Roman Catholic churches completed in 1980
Basilica churches in Oceania
20th-century Roman Catholic church buildings